United We Fall is an American television sitcom, created by Julius Sharpe, that premiered on ABC on July 15, 2020. It starred Will Sasso and Christina Vidal Mitchell as a couple with young children whose household is turned upside down when his mother (Jane Curtin) moves in with them. In September 2020, the series was canceled after one season.

Plot
A couple with young children and overzealous extended families lets the husband's judgmental mother move in with them.

Cast

Main

 Will Sasso as Bill Ryan, an engineer and father with two young daughters. He and his wife Jo strive to raise their family as hands-off as possible, which often annoys his mother Sandy.
 Christina Vidal Mitchell as Jo Rodriguez, Bill's wife who works for her family's contracting firm called Chuy & Sons Construction.
 Ella Grace Helton as Emily Ryan, Bill and Jo's older daughter who is both very intelligent and slightly antisocial.
 Guillermo Díaz as Chuy Rodriguez, one of Jo's brothers who likes to offer unsolicited advice and criticize his sister for not raising her kids properly.
 Jane Curtin as Sandy Ryan, Bill's neurotic mother who moved in with him while recovering from an illness. She now lives with the family and takes every opportunity to challenge his style of parenting.

Recurring

 Ireland & Sedona Carvajal as Lulu Ryan, Bill and Jo's younger daughter
 Natalie Ceballos as Brie Rodriguez, Chuy's wife.
 Juan Alfonso as Javier Rodriguez, one of Jo's brothers.
 J.R. Villarreal as Felix Rodriguez, one of Jo's brothers.

Guest stars
 Gloria Calderón Kellett as Ms. Molina, the head of Lulu's daycare. ("The Biter")
 Sarah Levy as Kendra, a parent of Lulu's classmate. ("The Biter")
 Sam McMurray as Dave Plonker, Sandy's first husband. ("My Favorite Marta" and "You're Doing It Wrong")
 Olivia Taylor Cohen as Marta Rodriguez, Chuy's daughter. ("My Favorite Marta" and "You're Doing It Wrong")
 Craig Kilborn as Dr. Sharpe, Sandy's doctor. ("My Favorite Marta")
 Greg Romero Wilson as Benicio Rodriguez, one of Jo's brothers, who is very negative. ("The Weekend" and "Re-Wedding Crashers")

Episodes

Production

Development 
On February 8, 2019, it was announced that ABC had given the production a pilot order. The pilot was written by Julius Sharpe and executive produced by Sharpe, Seth Gordon and Julia Gunn. On May 11, 2019, ABC ordered the pilot to series. In March 2019, it was reported Mark Cendrowski directed the pilot.

ABC initially slated the series as a mid-season replacement for the spring of 2020, with an eight-episode order. However, upon the outbreak of the COVID-19 pandemic in March 2020, ABC left the series off the schedule. In May 2020, Deadline Hollywood reported that ABC was looking to delay the premiere for the fall lineup of the 2020–21 television season, due to the unknown length of the pandemic. The same was done at rival network Fox, where two other new scripted series, Filthy Rich and Next, were also delayed to the 2020–21 fall schedule. The series did not make ABC's fall schedule, but in June 2020, ABC announced that the series would premiere on July 15, 2020. On September 15, 2020, ABC canceled the series after one season.

Casting 
It was announced in March 2019, with Will Sasso, Christina Vidal, Jane Curtin, and Jason Michael Snow in the pilot's lead roles. In September 2019, Guillermo Díaz joined the cast in a main role to replace Snow's character.

Reception

Critical response
On the review aggregation website Rotten Tomatoes, the series has an approval rating of 40% with an average rating of 6/10, based on 5 reviews. Metacritic gave it a weighted average score of 44 out of 100 based on 4 reviews, indicating "mixed or average reviews".

Ratings

References

External links

2020 American television series debuts
2020 American television series endings
2020s American sitcoms
American Broadcasting Company original programming
English-language television shows
Television productions postponed due to the COVID-19 pandemic
Television series about families
Television series by ABC Studios
Television series by Sony Pictures Television
Television shows set in Colorado